Aparavirus is a genus of viruses in the order Picornavirales, in the family Dicistroviridae. Invertebrates, honeybee, and bumblebees serve as natural hosts. There are six species in this genus. Diseases associated with this genus include: ABPV: paralysis. This virus plays a role in sudden collapse of honey bee colonies infested with the parasitic mite varroa destructor.

Taxonomy
The genus contains the following species:
Acute bee paralysis virus
Israeli acute paralysis virus
Kashmir bee virus
Mud crab virus
Solenopsis invicta virus-1
Taura syndrome virus

Structure
Viruses in Aparavirus are non-enveloped, with icosahedral geometries, and T=pseudo3 symmetry. The diameter is around 30 nm. Genomes are linear and non-segmented. The genome has 2 open reading frames.

Life cycle
Entry into the host cell is achieved by penetration into the host cell. Replication follows the positive stranded RNA virus replication model. Positive stranded RNA virus transcription is the method of transcription. Invertebrates, honeybee, and bumblebees serve as the natural host. Transmission routes are contamination and saliva.

References

External links
 Viralzone: Aparavirus
 ICTV

Dicistroviridae
Virus genera